The Mai Khola is a river in eastern Nepal, the headwater of the Kankai River. Its water is used for irrigation and also powers several hydroelectric plants.

Location

The Mai Khola is the main tributary of the Kankai River.
It flows from north to south.
Major tributaries include the Jog Mai Khola and Puwa Khola.
At its confluence with the Deb Mai Khola, it takes the name of Kankai Mai River, and when it enters the Jhapa District it becomes the Kankai River.

Mai AWP

The Mai Area Water Partnership (AWP) was established after a June 2002 workshop.
It is a network of local water-related institutions with the Namsaling Community Development Centre (NCDC), a non-governmental organization, as the host institution.
The purpose was to ensure sustainable irrigation development in the Mai River basin, the only basin in Ilam.
For the purpose of a pilot project study the Mai River basin was divided into 14 sub-basins, or blocks.
The study found that two of these blocks were water-stressed and another two had only just enough water flows for present demand.
One of the challenges of the AWP was to encourage the members to work together as a network, rather than use it as a forum to air grievances.
However, it was hoped that the AWP would provide a model for similar partnerships in other parts of Nepal.

Hydroelectricity

 seven hydropower projects on the Mai Khola were operational and another three were under development.
If the 6.2 MW Puwa Khola Hydropower Station is included, the active and under construction plants total 86.97 MW output.
The projects were:

About  of water is diverted to the power station.
The diverted water flows along a  headrace tunnel and then a  penstock pipe to the power station, which discharges it into the left bank of the Mai Khola.
This leaves very little irrigation water in the dry season.

Notes

Sources

Rivers of Koshi Province